Ahmad Ashfaque Karim  is a businessman, edupreneur and politician from Katihar, Bihar, India. He is a Member of Parliament in the Rajya Sabha of the Indian Parliament from Rashtriya Janata Dal party.

Career
Karim was appointed vice-president of the Lok Janshakti Party, and unsuccessfully contested the 2010 State Assembly election for Katihar constituency of the Lok Sabha.

In 2012, Karim established and Kosi Bedari Morcha, a group that campaigns for special status for Bihar's eight districts in Kosi division, one of the poorest regions of India.  He is the founder Chairman of Al-Karim Educational Trust, Patna, Bihar; founder Chancellor of Al-Karim University, Katihar, Bihar; and founder Chairman-cum-Managing Director of Katihar Medical College, Katihar, Bihar.

Karim was formerly the chairman and managing director of Katihar Medical College in Katihar. In June 2013, police arrested him at his home on suspicion of taking bribes from student applicants to the medical college. The police seized  hidden in various locations of his house and cars, medical college mark sheets and answer sheets, a currency-counting machine , and an unlicensed rifle. Karim and the medical college's clerk Mohammad Tanzim were charged and jailed under different sections of the Indian Penal Code for cheating and forgery in the college's entrance examinations, and Karim was charged under the Arms Act, 1959 for possession of an unlicensed firearm.

He is currently a member of the Rashtriya Janata Dal party, and was named a Rajya Sabha candidate for the biennial Rajya Sabha elections held in March 2018, for which he was one of five candidates elected unopposed.

References

External links
 Personal website

Rajya Sabha members from Bihar
People from Katihar
Social workers
1956 births
Living people
India MPs 2009–2014